Seabeard is an adventure video game developed by Hand Circus and released on December 10, 2014 by Backflip Studios for iOS and Android.

Gameplay
The player is the grandchild and the only descendant of the great explorer, Seabeard. Seabeard united all the rival tribes by forming a great city- Accordia. Then an ancient monster named Colosso rose from the depths of the sea and destroyed everything Seabeard built. That was the last time that Seabeard was seen and Accordia was left in ruins. The player now must restore Accordia to its former glory and reunite the people of this great land.

Development
Seabeard was released for iOS on December 10, 2014, and was later released for Android on March 13, 2015.

Reception

Gamezebo rated Seabeard 3/5. The game was compared to Animal Crossing.

References

General references
Theguardian.com
Gamezebo.com
Ign.com
Siliconera.com
Pocketgamer.co.uk

Adventure games
Simulation video games
Role-playing video games
IOS games
Android (operating system) games
2014 video games
Backflip Studios games